The common blackbird (Turdus merula) is a species of true thrush. It is also called the Eurasian blackbird (especially in North America, to distinguish it from the unrelated New World blackbirds), or simply the blackbird where this does not lead to confusion with a  local species. It breeds in Europe, Asiatic Russia, and North Africa, and has been introduced to Australia and New Zealand. It has a number of subspecies across its large range; a few of the Asian subspecies are sometimes considered to be full species. Depending on latitude, the common blackbird may be resident, partially migratory, or fully migratory.

The adult male of the common blackbird (Turdus merula merula, the nominate subspecies), which is found throughout most of Europe, is all black except for a yellow eye-ring and bill and has a rich, melodious song; the adult female and juvenile have mainly dark brown plumage. This species breeds in woods and gardens, building a neat, cup-shaped nest, bound together with mud. It is omnivorous, eating a wide range of insects, earthworms, berries, and fruits.

Both sexes are territorial on the breeding grounds, with distinctive threat displays, but are more gregarious during migration and in wintering areas. Pairs stay in their territory throughout the year where the climate is sufficiently temperate. This common and conspicuous species has given rise to a number of literary and cultural references, frequently related to its song.

Taxonomy and systematics
The common blackbird was described by Carl Linnaeus in his landmark 1758 10th edition of Systema Naturae as Turdus merula (characterised as T. ater, rostro palpebrisque fulvis). The binomial name derives from two Latin words, turdus, "thrush", and merula, "blackbird", the latter giving rise to its French name, merle, and its Scots name, merl.

About 65 species of medium to large thrushes are in the genus Turdus, characterised by rounded heads, longish, pointed wings, and usually melodious songs. Although two European thrushes, the song thrush and mistle thrush, are early offshoots from the Eurasian lineage of Turdus thrushes after they spread north from Africa, the blackbird is descended from ancestors that had colonised the Canary Islands from Africa and subsequently reached Europe from there. It is close in evolutionary terms to the island thrush (T. poliocephalus) of Southeast Asia and islands in the southwest Pacific, which probably diverged from T. merula stock fairly recently.

It may not immediately be clear why the name "blackbird", first recorded in 1486, was applied to this species, but not to one of the various other common black English birds, such as the carrion crow, raven, rook, or jackdaw. However, in Old English, and in modern English up to about the 18th century, "bird" was used only for smaller or young birds, and larger ones such as crows were called "fowl". At that time, the blackbird was therefore the only widespread and conspicuous "black bird" in the British Isles. Until about the 17th century, another name for the species was ouzel, ousel or wosel (from Old English osle, cf. German Amsel). Another variant occurs in Act 3 of Shakespeare's A Midsummer Night's Dream, where Bottom refers to "The Woosell cocke, so blacke of hew, With Orenge-tawny bill". The ouzel usage survived later in poetry, and still occurs as the name of the closely related ring ouzel (Turdus torquatus), and in water ouzel, an alternative name for the unrelated but superficially similar white-throated dipper (Cinclus cinclus).

Two related Asian Turdus thrushes, the white-collared blackbird (T. albocinctus) and the grey-winged blackbird (T. boulboul), are also named blackbirds, and the Somali thrush (T. (olivaceus) ludoviciae) is alternatively known as the Somali blackbird.

The icterid family of the New World is sometimes called the blackbird family because of some species' superficial resemblance to the common blackbird and other Old World thrushes, but they are not evolutionarily close, being related to the New World warblers and tanagers. The term is often limited to smaller species with mostly or entirely black plumage, at least in the breeding male, notably the cowbirds, the grackles, and for around 20 species with "blackbird" in the name, such as the red-winged blackbird and the melodious blackbird.

Subspecies
As would be expected for a widespread passerine bird species, several geographical subspecies are recognised. The treatment of subspecies in this article follows Clement et al. (2000).

 The European blackbird (T. m. merula), the nominate subspecies, breeds commonly throughout much of Europe from Iceland, the Faroes and the British Isles east to the Ural Mountains and north to about 70 N, where it is fairly scarce. A small population breeds in the Nile Valley. Birds from the north of the range winter throughout Europe and around the Mediterranean, including Cyprus and North Africa. The introduced birds in Australia and New Zealand are of the nominate race.
 The Azores blackbird (T. m. azorensis) is a small race which breeds in the Azores. The male is darker and glossier than merula.
 The Madeiran blackbird (T. m. cabrerae), named for Ángel Cabrera, the Spanish zoologist, resembles azorensis and breeds in Madeira and the western Canary Islands.
 The Northwestern African blackbird (T. m. mauritanicus), another small dark subspecies with a glossy black male plumage, breeds in central and northern Morocco, coastal Algeria and northern Tunisia.
 The Southeastern European blackbird (T m. aterrimus) breeds in Hungary, south and east to southern Greece, Crete, northern Turkey and northern Iran. It winters in southern Turkey, northern Egypt, Iraq and southern Iran. It is smaller than merula with a duller male and paler female plumage.
 The Levant blackbird (T. m. syriacus) breeds on the Mediterranean coast of southern Turkey south to Jordan, Israel and the northern Sinai. It is mostly resident, but part of the population moves southwest or west to winter in the Jordan Valley and in the Nile Delta of northern Egypt south to about Cairo. Both sexes of this subspecies are darker and greyer than the equivalent merula plumages.
 The Central Asian blackbird (T. m. intermedius) is an Asian race breeding from Central Russia to Tajikistan, western and northeastern Afghanistan, and eastern China. Many birds are resident, but some are altitudinal migrants and occur in southern Afghanistan and southern Iraq in winter. This is a large subspecies, with a sooty-black male and a blackish-brown female.

The Central Asian subspecies, the relatively large intermedius, also differs in structure and voice, and may represent a distinct species. Alternatively, it has been suggested that it should be considered a subspecies of T. maximus, but it differs in structure, voice and the appearance of the eye-ring.

Similar species
In Europe, the common blackbird can be confused with the paler-winged first-winter ring ouzel (Turdus torquatus) or the superficially similar common starling (Sturnus vulgaris). A number of similar Turdus thrushes exist far outside the range of the common blackbird, for example the South American Chiguanco thrush (Turdus chiguanco). The Indian blackbird, the Tibetan blackbird, and the Chinese blackbird were formerly considered subspecies of the common blackbird.

Description

The adult male has glossy black plumage, blackish-brown legs, a yellow eye-ring and an orange-yellow bill. The bill darkens somewhat in winter. The adult female is sooty-brown with a dull yellowish-brownish bill, a brownish-white throat and some weak mottling on the breast. The juvenile is similar to the female, but has pale spots on the upperparts, and the very young juvenile also has a speckled breast. Young birds vary in the shade of brown, with darker birds presumably males. The first year male resembles the adult male, but has a dark bill and weaker eye ring, and its folded wing is brown, rather than black like the body plumage.

Distribution and habitat
The common blackbird breeds in temperate Eurasia, North Africa, the Canary Islands, and South Asia. It has been introduced to Australia and New Zealand. Populations are sedentary in the south and west of the range, although northern birds migrate south as far as northern Africa and tropical Asia in winter. Urban males are more likely to overwinter in cooler climes than rural males, an adaptation made feasible by the warmer microclimate and relatively abundant food that allow the birds to establish territories and start reproducing earlier in the year. Recoveries of blackbirds ringed on the Isle of May show that these birds commonly migrate from southern Norway (or from as far north as Trondheim) to Scotland, and some onwards to Ireland. Scottish-ringed birds have also been recovered in England, Belgium, Holland, Denmark, and Sweden. Female blackbirds in Scotland and the north of England migrate more (to Ireland) in winter than do the males

Common over most of its range in woodland, the common blackbird has a preference for deciduous trees with dense undergrowth. However, gardens provide the best breeding habitat with up to 7.3 pairs per hectare (nearly three pairs per acre), with woodland typically holding about a tenth of that density, and open and very built-up habitats even less. They are often replaced by the related ring ouzel in areas of higher altitude. The common blackbird also lives in parks, gardens and hedgerows.

This widespread species has occurred as a vagrant in many locations in Eurasia outside its normal range, but records from North America are normally considered to involve escapees, including, for example, the 1971 bird in Quebec. However, a 1994 record from Bonavista, Newfoundland, has been accepted as a genuine wild bird, and the species is therefore on the North American list.

Behaviour and ecology
The male common blackbird defends its breeding territory, chasing away other males or utilising a "bow and run" threat display. This consists of a short run, the head first being raised and then bowed with the tail dipped simultaneously. If a fight between male blackbirds does occur, it is usually short and the intruder is soon chased away. The female blackbird is also aggressive in the spring when it competes with other females for a good nesting territory, and although fights are less frequent, they tend to be more violent.

The bill's appearance is important in the interactions of the common blackbird. The territory-holding male responds more aggressively towards models with orange bills than to those with yellow bills, and reacts least to the brown bill colour typical of the first-year male. The female is, however, relatively indifferent to bill colour, but responds instead to shinier bills.

As long as winter food is available, both the male and female will remain in the territory throughout the year, although occupying different areas. Migrants are more gregarious, travelling in small flocks and feeding in loose groups in the wintering grounds. The flight of migrating birds comprises bursts of rapid wing beats interspersed with level or diving movement, and differs from both the normal fast agile flight of this species and the more dipping action of larger thrushes.

Breeding
The male common blackbird attracts the female with a courtship display which consists of oblique runs combined with head-bowing movements, an open beak, and a "strangled" low song. The female remains motionless until she raises her head and tail to permit copulation. This species is monogamous, and the established pair will usually stay together as long as they both survive. Pair separation rates of up to 20% have been noted following poor breeding. Although the species is socially monogamous, there have been studies showing as much as 17% extra-pair paternity.

The nominate T. merula may commence breeding in March, but eastern and Indian races are a month or more later, and the introduced New Zealand birds start nesting in August (late winter). The breeding pair prospect for a suitable nest site in a creeper or bush, favouring evergreen or thorny species such as ivy, holly, hawthorn, honeysuckle or pyracantha. Sometimes the birds will nest in sheds or outbuildings where a ledge or cavity is used. The cup-shaped nest is made with grasses, leaves and other vegetation, bound together with mud. It is built by the female alone. Eggs of birds of the southern Indian races are paler than those from the northern subcontinent and Europe.

The female incubates for 12–14 days before the altricial chicks are hatched naked and blind. Fledging takes another 10–19 (average 13.6) days, with both parents feeding the young and removing faecal sacs. The nest is often ill-concealed compared with those of other species, and many breeding attempts fail due to predation. The young are fed by the parents for up to three weeks after leaving the nest, and will follow the adults begging for food. If the female starts another nest, the male alone will feed the fledged young. Second broods are common, with the female reusing the same nest if the brood was successful, and three broods may be raised in the south of the common blackbird's range.

A common blackbird has an average life expectancy of 2.4 years, and, based on data from bird ringing, the oldest recorded age is 21 years and 10 months.

Songs and calls

In its native Northern Hemisphere range, the first-year male common blackbird of the nominate race may start singing as early as late January in fine weather in order to establish a territory, followed in late March by the adult male. The male's song is a varied and melodious low-pitched fluted warble, given from trees, rooftops or other elevated perches mainly in the period from March to June, sometimes into the beginning of July. It has a number of other calls, including an aggressive seee, a pook-pook-pook alarm for terrestrial predators like cats, and various chink and chook, chook vocalisations. The territorial male invariably gives chink-chink calls in the evening in an attempt (usually unsuccessful) to deter other blackbirds from roosting in its territory overnight. During the northern winter, blackbirds can be heard quietly singing to themselves, so much so that September and October are the only months in which the song cannot be heard. Like other passerine birds, it has a thin high seee alarm call for threats from birds of prey since the sound is rapidly attenuated in vegetation, making the source difficult to locate.

At least two subspecies, T. m. merula and T. m. nigropileus, will mimic other species of birds, cats, humans or alarms, but this is usually quiet and hard to detect.

Feeding

The common blackbird is omnivorous, eating a wide range of insects, earthworms, seeds and berries. It feeds mainly on the ground, running and hopping with a start-stop-start progress. It pulls earthworms from the soil, usually finding them by sight, but sometimes by hearing, and roots through leaf litter for other invertebrates. Small amphibians, lizards and (on rare occasions) small mammals are occasionally hunted. This species will also perch in bushes to take berries and collect caterpillars and other active insects. Animal prey predominates, and is particularly important during the breeding season, with windfall apples and berries taken more in the autumn and winter. The nature of the fruit taken depends on what is locally available, and frequently includes exotics in gardens.

Natural threats

Near human habitation the main predator of the common blackbird is the domestic cat, with newly fledged young especially vulnerable. Foxes and predatory birds, such as the sparrowhawk and other accipiters, also take this species when the opportunity arises. However, there is little direct evidence to show that either predation of the adult blackbirds or loss of the eggs and chicks to corvids, such as the European magpie or Eurasian jay, decrease population numbers.

This species is occasionally a host of parasitic cuckoos, such as the common cuckoo (Cuculus canorus), but this is minimal because the common blackbird recognizes the adult of the parasitic species and its non-mimetic eggs. In the UK, only three nests of 59,770 examined (0.005%) contained cuckoo eggs. The introduced merula blackbird in New Zealand, where the cuckoo does not occur, has, over the past 130 years, lost the ability to recognize the adult common cuckoo but still rejects non-mimetic eggs.

As with other passerine birds, parasites are common. Intestinal parasites were found in 88% of common blackbirds, most frequently Isospora and Capillaria species. and more than 80% had haematozoan parasites (Leucocytozoon, Plasmodium, Haemoproteus and Trypanosoma species).

Common blackbirds spend much of their time looking for food on the ground where they can become infested with ticks, which are external parasites that most commonly attach to the head of a blackbird. In France, 74% of rural blackbirds were found to be infested with Ixodes ticks, whereas, only 2% of blackbirds living in urban habitats were infested. This is partly because it is more difficult for ticks to find another host on lawns and gardens in urban areas than in uncultivated rural areas, and partly because ticks are likely to be commoner in rural areas, where a variety of tick hosts, such as foxes, deer and boar, are more numerous. Although ixodid ticks can transmit pathogenic viruses and bacteria, and are known to transmit Borrelia bacteria to birds, there is no evidence that this affects the fitness of blackbirds except when they are exhausted and run down after migration.

The common blackbird is one of a number of species which has unihemispheric slow-wave sleep. One hemisphere of the brain is effectively asleep, while a low-voltage EEG, characteristic of wakefulness, is present in the other. The benefit of this is that the bird can rest in areas of high predation or during long migratory flights, but still retain a degree of alertness.

Status and conservation
The species is not believed to approach the thresholds for the population decline criterion of the IUCN Red List (i.e., declining more than 30% in ten years or three generations), and is therefore evaluated as least concern. In the western Palearctic, populations are generally stable or increasing, but there have been local declines, especially on farmland, which may be due to agricultural policies that encouraged farmers to remove hedgerows (which provide nesting places), and to drain damp grassland and increase the use of pesticides, both of which could have reduced the availability of invertebrate food.

The common blackbird was introduced to Australia by a bird dealer visiting Melbourne in early 1857, and its range has expanded from its initial foothold in Melbourne and Adelaide to include all of southeastern Australia, including Tasmania and the Bass Strait islands. The introduced population in Australia is considered a pest because it damages a variety of soft fruits in orchards, parks and gardens, including berries, cherries, stone fruit and grapes. It is thought to spread weeds, such as blackberry, and may compete with native birds for food and nesting sites.

The introduced common blackbird is, together with the native silvereye (Zosterops lateralis), the most widely distributed avian seed disperser in New Zealand. It eats a wide range of native and exotic fruit, and makes a major contribution to the development of communities of naturalised woody weeds. These communities provide fruit more suited to non-endemic native birds and naturalised birds than to endemic birds.

In popular culture

The common blackbird was seen as a sacred though destructive bird in Classical Greek folklore, and was said to die if it consumed pomegranates. Like many other small birds, it has in the past been trapped in rural areas at its night roosts as an easily available addition to the diet, and in medieval times the practice of placing live birds under a pie crust just before serving may have been the origin of the familiar nursery rhyme:
Sing a song of sixpence,
A pocket full of rye;
Four and twenty blackbirds baked in a pie!
When the pie was opened the birds began to sing,
Oh, wasn't that a dainty dish to set before the king?

The common blackbird's melodious, distinctive song is mentioned in the poem Adlestrop by Edward Thomas;
And for that minute a blackbird sang
Close by, and round him, mistier, 
Farther and farther, all the birds 
Of Oxfordshire and Gloucestershire.

In the English Christmas carol "The Twelve Days of Christmas", the line commonly sung today as "four calling birds" is believed to have originally been written in the 18th century as "four colly birds", an archaism meaning "black as coal" that was a popular English nickname for the common blackbird.

The common blackbird, unlike many black creatures, is not normally seen as a symbol of bad luck, but R. S. Thomas wrote that there is "a suggestion of dark Places about it", and it symbolised resignation in the 17th century tragic play The Duchess of Malfi; an alternate connotation is vigilance, the bird's clear cry warning of danger.

The common blackbird is the national bird of Sweden, which has a breeding population of 1–2 million pairs, and was featured on a 30 öre Christmas postage stamp in 1970; it has also featured on a number of other stamps issued by European and Asian countries, including a 1966 4d British stamp and a 1998 Irish 30p stamp. This bird—arguably—also gives rise to the Serbian name for Kosovo (and Metohija), which is the possessive adjectival form of Serbian kos ("blackbird") as in Kosovo Polje ("Blackbird Field").

A common blackbird can be heard singing on the Beatles song "Blackbird".

A blackbird can also be heard along with a woodpigeon on the Kate Bush song "Aerial Tal".

References

Further reading
 Snow, David W. (1987). The Blackbird. Shire Natural History

External links

Species information
 BBC Science & Nature – Blackbird, with song clip (archive)
 Birds of Britain – Blackbird
 Madeira Birdwatching – Information on subspecies cabrerae
 RSPB – Blackbird, including video and sound clips
 iberCaja Classroom Network – Blackbird ageing and sexing (archived PDF; 5.3 MB) by Javier Blasco-Zumeta & Gerd-Michael Heinze 
 Ornithos – Feathers of common blackbird (Turdus merula)

Sounds and videos
 
 Blackbird videos, photos & sounds on the Internet Bird Collection
 Other blackbird songs on Sonatura

Images
 ARKive – Blackbird still images (archive)

common blackbird
Birds of Europe
Birds of Central Asia
Birds of Oceania
common blackbird
common blackbird